Virtual Reference Station (VRS) networks use real-time kinematic (RTK) solutions to provide high-accuracy, RTK Global Navigation Satellite Systems.

To reach centimeter-level – or even better – accuracy of positioning typically requires precise dual-frequency carrier phase observations. Furthermore, these observations are usually processed using a differential GNSS (DGNSS) algorithm, such as real time kinematic (RTK) or post-processing (PP). Regardless of the specific differential algorithm, however, implicit in the process is an assumption that the quality of the reference station data is consistent with the desired level of positioning accuracy.

The virtual reference station (VRS) concept can help to satisfy this requirement using a network of reference stations. As a quick review, a typical DGNSS setup consists of a single reference station from which the raw data (or corrections) are sent to the rover receiver (i.e., the user). The user then forms the carrier phase differences (or corrects their raw data) and performs the data processing using the differential corrections.

In contrast, GNSS network architectures often make use of multiple reference stations. This approach allows a more precise modeling of distance-dependent systematic errors principally caused by ionospheric and tropospheric refractions, and satellite orbit errors. More specifically, a GNSS network decreases the dependence of the error budget on the distance of nearest antenna.

References

https://gisresources.com/virtual-reference-station/ - What is Virtual Reference station (VRS) by GIS Resources
Kinematics
Satellite navigation